Abdullah Mohsen al-Akwa (born 18 April 1961) is a Yemeni politician who was acting Prime Minister of Yemen from 24 September 2014 to 9 November 2014.

Born in 1961 in Sana'a, he graduated from high school and later studied in France in 1978 to get Bachelor Degree in Computer Science. In 1994, he is one of the founding member of the Islah political party and served in Ministry of Electricity and Water the same year. Between 2001 and 2010, he was the Vice-Chairman of the Supreme Committee for Elections and Referendum.

He is married and has 3 daughters.

References

1961 births
Living people
Prime Ministers of Yemen
Deputy Prime Ministers of Yemen
Energy ministers of Yemen
People from Sanaa
21st-century Yemeni politicians
21st-century prime ministers of Yemen
Electricity ministers of Yemen
Members of the Consultative Assembly of Yemen
Bahah Cabinet
Bin Dagher Cabinet
Basindawa Cabinet
First Maeen Cabinet